Koila is a community of the city of Kozani in northern Greece. It is located 4 km north of the center of the city, between Kozani and Via Egnatia. It consists of Koila and three other settlements: Kardia, Exochi and Melissia. The population is 1,643 (2011).

The Technological Educational Institut (T.E.I.) and the Exhibition Center of West Macedonia are located in Koila. In September, the Center hosts the annual Commercial Exhibition of Kozani. Many firms from Greece and the other Balkan countries exhibit their products.

References

Kozani
Populated places in Kozani (regional unit)